Justin Bruihl (born June 26, 1997) is an American professional baseball pitcher for the Los Angeles Dodgers of Major League Baseball (MLB). He made his MLB debut in 2021.

Early life and amateur career
Bruihl was born and grew up in Petaluma, California and attended Casa Grande High School. He tore the ulnar collateral ligament in his pitching elbow early in his junior season and had Tommy John surgery. Bruihl returned to pitching in the second half of his senior year but was limited to  innings pitched, striking out 27 batters and allowing no earned runs.

Bruihl enrolled at California Polytechnic State University, San Luis Obispo, where he played college baseball for the Cal Poly Mustangs. He led the team with 25 appearances as a freshman and had a 1–3 win–loss record with a 4.88 earned run average (ERA) and 27 strikeouts over  innings pitched. After the season, he transferred to Santa Rosa Junior College and posted a 7–0 record and 2.12 ERA with 59 strikeouts over 51 innings pitched in his sophomore season. Bruihl had committed to transfer to the University of California after the end of his sophomore season.

Professional career
Bruihl was signed by the Los Angeles Dodgers as an undrafted free agent on July 15, 2017. He was assigned to the Ogden Raptors of the Pioneer League the following season to begin his professional career. Bruihl began the 2019 season with the Class-A Advanced Rancho Cucamonga Quakes before being reassigned to the Class A Great Lakes Loons. After beginning the 2021 season with the Double-A Tulsa Drillers, Bruihl was promoted to the Triple-A Oklahoma City Dodgers on June 1, 2021. The Dodgers selected Bruihl's contract and promoted him the Major League roster on August 8, 2021. He made his major league debut the same day against the Los Angeles Angels, striking out the first batter he faced (Brandon Marsh) and pitching  innings. He pitched in  innings for the Dodgers in 2021 over 21 games and allowed six earned runs (2.89 ERA) on 13 hits. He also made 26 appearances in the minors (eight for Tulsa and 18 for Oklahoma City) where he had a 2.63 ERA. Bruihl was left off the postseason roster for the first two rounds but added for the 2021 National League Championship Series, where he pitched two scoreless innings allowing only one hit while striking out five batters. 

In 2022, Bruihl split the season between the majors and the minors. He pitched in 25 games for Oklahoma City with a 3–1 record and 3.56 ERA and in 24 games for Los Angeles, with a 1–1 record and 3.80 ERA. On September 18, he picked up his first career save against the San Francisco Giants.

References

External links

Cal Poly Mustangs bio

1997 births
Living people
Baseball players from California
Major League Baseball pitchers
Los Angeles Dodgers players
Cal Poly Mustangs baseball players
Walla Walla Sweets players
Ogden Raptors players
Great Lakes Loons players
Rancho Cucamonga Quakes players
Tulsa Drillers players
Oklahoma City Dodgers players
Santa Rosa Bear Cubs baseball players